is a retired Japanese female professional wrestler, better known by the ring name .

Career 
Chieko Suzuki was born on December 4, 1969, and was raised in Kyoto, Japan. In 1986 she auditioned for All Japan Women's Pro-Wrestling (AJW), but was unsuccessful, and instead joined the first rookie class of Japan Women's Pro-Wrestling. She debuted on August 17, 1986 in Korakuen Hall, Tokyo  under the ring name Miss A. When Japan Women's Pro-Wrestling was dissolved, Suzuki became part of the JWP Project. She wrestled in the United States for World Championship Wrestling, but returned to Japan in 1991, and changed her ring name to Dynamite Kansai. After leaving Japan Women's Pro-Wrestling in the mid-1990s, she joined a new wrestling promotion organisation, GAEA Japan. In 2006, she worked for Mayumi Ozaki's promotion, OZ Academy. In 2015, Kansai returned to the United States for the first time in twenty-four years, appearing for Shimmer Women Athletes alongside Aja Kong. In 2012, she was diagnosed with lung cancer and was declared cancer-free after a four-year battle. Kansai ended her 30-year career on December 11, 2016, defeating Mayumi Ozaki in her retirement match.

Championships and accomplishments 
 All Japan Women's Pro-Wrestling
 WWWA World Single Championship (1 time)
 WWWA World Tag Team Championship (1 time) – with Mayumi Ozaki
 Gaea Japan
 AAAW Single Championship (1 time)
 JWP Joshi Puroresu
 JWP Openweight Championship (2 times)
 JWP Tag Team Championship (3 times) – with Devil Masami (1) and Cutie Suzuki (2)
 Oz Academy
 Oz Academy Openweight Championship (1 time)
 Oz Academy Tag Team Championship (1 time) – with Carlos Amano
 Pro Wrestling Wave
 Dual Shock Wave (2016) – with Rina Yamashita
 Wrestling Observer Newsletter
 Match of the Year (1993) with Mayumi Ozaki vs. Manami Toyota and Toshiyo Yamada

References

External links 

 Oz Academy profile

1969 births
Living people
Japanese female professional wrestlers
Sportspeople from Kyoto
20th-century professional wrestlers
21st-century professional wrestlers
Oz Academy Openweight Champions
Oz Academy Tag Team Champions
AAAW Single Champions